Harmon Creek is a  long 3rd order tributary to the Ohio River in Brooke County, West Virginia.

Variant names
According to the Geographic Names Information System, it has also been known historically as:
Hard Bargain Creek
Harman's Creek
Harmons Creek
Horman's Creek
Hormans Creek

Course
Harmon Creek rises about 0.25 miles south of Florence, Pennsylvania, in Washington County and then flows south and west into West Virginia and Brooke County and briefly turns north into Hancock County to join the Ohio River at the south end of Weirton.

Watershed
Harmon Creek drains  of area, receives about 40.2 in/year of precipitation, has a wetness index of 326.37, and is about 70% forested.

See also
List of rivers of Pennsylvania
List of rivers of West Virginia

References

Rivers of West Virginia
Rivers of Pennsylvania
Rivers of Washington County, Pennsylvania
Rivers of Brooke County, West Virginia
Rivers of Hancock County, West Virginia
Tributaries of the Ohio River